Konar Zard (also Romanized as Konār Zard, Kanār-e Zard, and Konār-e Zard) is a village in Kukherd Rural District, Kukherd District, Bastak County, Hormozgan Province, Iran. At the 2006 census, its population was 242, in 53 families.

References

External links 

  Kookherd Website.

Populated places in Bastak County
Kukherd District